Jack D. "Jumping Jack" McCracken (June 15, 1912 – January 5, 1958) was an American basketball player in the 1930s and 1940s.

A native of Chickasha, Oklahoma, McCracken went to Classen High School in Oklahoma City, Oklahoma. He attended Northwest Missouri State Teachers College (now Northwest Missouri State University) in Maryville, Missouri and played for coach Henry Iba, who had also coached him in high school. McCracken never turned professional.

After leaving Northwest Missouri State Teachers College, he went to Denver, Colorado, to play in the AAU.

External links 
 Jack "Jumping Jack" McCracken biography on hoophall.com

1912 births
1958 deaths
Basketball players from Oklahoma
Naismith Memorial Basketball Hall of Fame inductees
National Collegiate Basketball Hall of Fame inductees
Northwest Missouri State Bearcats men's basketball players
People from Chickasha, Oklahoma
Phillips 66ers players
Sportspeople from Oklahoma City
American men's basketball players
Forwards (basketball)
Classen School of Advanced Studies alumni